The marathon at the 1952 Summer Olympics was held on 27 July on a course running from the Helsinki Olympic Stadium to Korso, Helsinki Rural Municipality (now Vantaa) and back. Sixty-six athletes from 32 nations competed. The maximum number of athletes per nation had been set at 3 since the 1930 Olympic Congress. 

The event was won by Emil Zátopek of Czechoslovakia, the nation's first Olympic marathon medal. Zátopek completed a long distance triple that has never been matched: the 5000 metres, 10000 metres, and marathon golds in a single Games. Reinaldo Gorno's silver medal put Argentina on the marathon podium for the second straight Games, and the third of the four times Argentina had competed. Sweden took its first marathon medal since 1900, as Gustaf Jansson matched the nation's best result to date in the event. Great Britain's three-Games marathon medal streak ended.

Background

This was the 12th appearance of the event, which is one of 12 athletics events to have been held at every Summer Olympics. Returning runners from the 1948 marathon included defending champion Delfo Cabrera of Argentina and sixth- through eighth-place finishers Syd Luyt of South Africa, Gustav Östling of Sweden, and John Systad of Norway. The favorite was Jim Peters of Great Britain, the 1951 and 1952 Polytechnic Marathon winner who had broken the world record at the 1952 race. Emil Zátopek of Czechoslovakia had never run a marathon before, but had won the 5000 metres and 10000 metres earlier in the Games and decided to enter the marathon.

Egypt, Guatemala, Pakistan, and the Soviet Union each made their first appearance in Olympic marathons. The United States made its 12th appearance, the only nation to have competed in each Olympic marathon to that point.

Competition format and course

As all Olympic marathons, the competition was a single race. The marathon distance of 26 miles, 385 yards was run over a "straight out-and-back course, starting and finishing at the Olympic Stadium" and going to Korso. The full length of the road was hard-surfaced.

Records

These were the standing world and Olympic records prior to the 1952 Summer Olympics.

Emil Zátopek set a new Olympic best at 2:23:03.2.

Schedule

The day was "fairly cool."

All times are Eastern European Summer Time (UTC+3)

Results

References 

Athletics at the 1952 Summer Olympics
Marathons at the Olympics
Men's marathons
Oly
Men's events at the 1952 Summer Olympics